Brahmavart railway station is a small railway station in Kanpur district, Uttar Pradesh. Its code is BRT. It serves Bithoor city. The station consists of a single platform. The platform is not well sheltered. It lacks many facilities including water and sanitation.

References

Railway stations in Kanpur Nagar district
Lucknow NER railway division